The Borulakh (Boruulaax) is a river in the Republic of Sakha in Russia. It is a left hand tributary of the Adycha, of the Yana basin.

The river is not navigable. It usually freezes in October and stays under thick ice until June.

Course 
The river begins in the Yana Plateau and flows all the way along it. It heads first roughly north strongly meandering in its middle and lower course then is bends to the northeast around the Tirekhtyakh Range mountain area. Finally it joins the Adycha downstream from the Nelgese, the largest tributary.

There are about 350 lakes in the river basin. The main tributaries of the Borulakh are the Kaltysy and Khatyngnakh.

See also
List of rivers of Russia
Yana-Oymyakon Highlands§Hydrography

References

Rivers of the Sakha Republic